Miss Rhythm is an album by vocalist Ruth Brown featuring tracks recorded between 1954 and 1959 and released on the Atlantic label.

Reception

Allmusic awarded the album 3½ stars stating "Ruth Brown's second LP is a minor masterpiece".

Track listing
 "This Little Girl's Gone Rockin'" (Manny Curtis, Bobby Darin) – 1:51
 "Just Too Much" (Jerry Wexler, C. Taylor) – 2:30
 "I Hope We Meet (On the Road Someday)" (Rudy Toombs) – 2:44
 "Why Me" (Brook Benton, Belford Hendricks, Ronald Mack) – 2:25
 "Somebody Touched Me" (Ahmet Ertegun) – 2:27
 "When I Get You Baby" (Jimmy Lewis, Ruth Brown) – 2:08
 "Jack O' Diamonds" (Jerry Leiber, Mike Stoller) – 2:33
 "I Can't Hear a Word You Say" (Leiber, Stoller) – 2:30
 "One More Time" (Rose Marie McCoy, Charlie Singleton) – 2:41
 "Book of Lies" (C. Small, D. Moore) – 2:33
 "I Can See Everybody's Baby" (Leroy Kirkland, Mamie Thomas) – 3:02
 "Show Me" (Joe Shapiro, Lou Stallman) – 2:37

Personnel 
Ruth Brown – vocal with various personnel including
Ed "Tiger" Lewis, Steve Lipkins, Joe Wilder – trumpet
Jimmy Cleveland, Richard Harris – trombone
Jimmy Mitchell, Jerome Richardson – alto saxophone
Arnett Cobb, King Curtis, Budd Johnson, Sam Taylor – tenor saxophone
Sylvester Thomas – baritone saxophone
Lee Anderson, Dick Hyman, Bu Pleasant, Mike Stoller – piano
Mickey Baker, Al Caiola, Allen Hanlon, Mundell Lowe, Charles Macey – guitar
Abie Baker, Percy Heath, Benny Moten, Lloyd Trotman – bass
Connie Kay, Joe Marshall, Noruddin Zafer – drums
Jerry Duane, Bob Harter, Artie Malvin, Bill Marine, Robert Miller, Ralph Nyland, The Rhythmakers, Maeretha Stewart – backing vocals

References 

1959 albums
Ruth Brown albums
Atlantic Records albums